Melrose ("bald moor") is a small town and civil parish in the Scottish Borders, historically in Roxburghshire. It lies within the Eildon committee area of Scottish Borders Council.

History
The original Melrose was Mailros, meaning "the bare peninsula" in Old Welsh or Brythonic. This referred to a neck of land by the River Tweed several miles east of the present town, where in the 6th century a monastery was founded associated with St Cuthbert. It was recorded by Bede, and also in the Anglo-Saxon Chronicle with the name Magilros. This monastery and settlement, later known as "Old Melrose", were long abandoned by the 12th century.

King David I of Scotland took the throne in 1124, and sought to create a new Cistercian monastery on that site; however the monks preferred a site further west called "Fordel". So the monastery now known as Melrose Abbey was founded there in 1136, and the town of Melrose grew up on its present site around it. In the late Middle Ages, its name was represented by a mell (a mason's hammer) and a rose (for the Virgin Mary, to whom all Cistercian abbeys were dedicated). The Abbey fell into ruin after the Reformation but is still a striking structure. Several Scottish nobles are buried there, and a casket has been found which is believed to contain the heart of King Robert the Bruce. The casket has been re-buried in the Abbey. The Abbey ruins are cared for by Historic Scotland (open all year; entrance charge).

Nearby is the Roman fort of Trimontium, Abbotsford House the home of Sir Walter Scott, and Dryburgh Abbey where he's buried. Melrose is surrounded by the small villages of Darnick, Gattonside, Newstead, Lilliesleaf and Bowden.

The Melrose war memorial was designed by Sir Robert Lorimer in 1920.

Sport
Melrose is the birthplace of Rugby Sevens and also has a rugby union team, Melrose RFC. Every year on the second Saturday in April the famous Melrose Sevens are held at the Greenyards and is the biggest annual sporting event held in the town. Rugby union has always been the most popular sport in Melrose.

Melrose Golf Club is a nine-hole golf course situated on the edge of the town at the foot of the Eildon Hills.

Melrose Cricket Club is situated next to Borders General Hospital at Huntlyburn.

Festivals
Every June, the week-long Melrose Festival takes place. This involves appointing a Melrosian who has lived in the town for most of his life; and a queen and her court are appointed from the local primary school, Melrose Primary School (previously named Melrose Grammar School).

Melrose is now host to the annual Borders Book Festival which also takes place during June. The 2005 festival hosted guests including Michael Palin and Germaine Greer; Ian Rankin and Rory Bremner appeared in 2006.

Other events
Melrose hosts the annual Eildon Two Hills Race, attracting many runners, and the Melrose Pipe Band Championships, attracting pipers from all over the world.

Notable people

 King Arthur, supposedly buried in the Eildon Hills, which overlook the town
 James Blair, recipient of the Victoria Cross
 Craig Chalmers, rugby union footballer, capped 60 times for Scotland
 Richard Curle, author, critic and journalist
 Sir Adam Ferguson, army officer and Deputy Keeper of the Scottish Regalia lived at Huntlyburn House, now a wing of the Hospital.
 Ned Haig, butcher and rugby union footballer who founded rugby sevens and the Melrose Sevens
 Stuart Hogg, rugby union footballer, captain of Scotland
 John Robertson Henderson FRSE FZS FLS, zoologist
 William Kerr, recipient of the Victoria Cross
 Keith Robertson, rugby union footballer
 Mark Robertson, son of Keith Robertson; rugby union sevens, 2016 Olympic silver medalist
 Sarah Robertson, field hockey player
 Sir Walter Scott, his home Abbotsford House lies a few miles west of the town
 Catherine Helen Spence (1825–1910), Australian author, teacher, journalist, politician and suffragette; born in Melrose, and left for Australia aged fourteen
 Jim Telfer, rugby union footballer and coach

Gallery

See also
Borders General Hospital
Buglass, Scottish surname from old lands of Booklawes near Melrose
Harmony Garden, a National Trust for Scotland garden in Melrose
Priorwood Garden, also NTS
List of places in the Scottish Borders
List of places in Scotland

References

External links

Melrose official website

 
Eildon
Towns in the Scottish Borders
Parishes in Roxburghshire
Populated places on the River Tweed